Atriplex bunburyana, commonly known as silver saltbush, is a species of saltbush endemic to Western Australia.

Description
It grows as an erect shrub up to a metre high, with slender branches that are often straight and rigid. Leaves are oval in shape, five to 20 millimetres long, with a linear margin and a blueish colour caused by a thin scaly coating.

Taxonomy
It was first published by Ferdinand von Mueller in 1882 under the name Atriplex bunburyanum, but this name was orthographically invalid and has been corrected to Atriplex bunburyana. The name refers to the collector of the type specimen, a Miss Bunbury, who collected specimens of this species from the Gascoyne River in 1882.

Distribution and habitat
Endemic to Western Australia, it occurs through most of the western half of the state, both near the coast and inland.

References

bunburyana
Eudicots of Western Australia
Caryophyllales of Australia
Taxa named by Ferdinand von Mueller